Christian Gottlieb Richter (ca. 1700 – 1763) was a German organ builder who worked mainly in Pomerania and Brandenburg.

Life 
Richter was probably a son (or brother) of the organ builder Christian Heinrich Richter in Frankfurt/Oder and Storkow, with whom he jointly signed a repair contract in 1739. In 1730, he was probably the Königl[ich] c[on]c[essionierte] Orgel Bauer in Stettin (or David Richter?). From 1732, he lived in Stralsund, from 1742 in Demmin, from 1744 in Friedland, and in 1757 in Soldin. 

Richter created several new organs, including in the St.-Jakobi-Kirche in Stralsund with 42 stops, whose casing has been preserved, as well as repairs and extensions.

The organ builder Simon David Richter was probably a son or other relative, while Christian Joachim Richter probably came from the Storkow family.

Work (selection) 
New organ buildings

References

Further reading 
 Uwe Pape, Wolfram Hackel, Christhard Kirchner (ed.): Lexikon norddeutscher Orgelbauer. Vol. 4. Berlin, Brandenburg und Umgebung einschließlich Mecklenburg-Vorpommern. Pape Verlag, Berlin 2017, pp. 411f.

 

German pipe organ builders
Date of birth missing
Date of death missing
Place of birth missing